David Simmons (born 6 December 1984) is an Australian former professional rugby league footballer. He played for the Cronulla-Sutherland Sharks and Penrith Panthers in the National Rugby League.

Playing career

Cronulla-Sutherland Sharks
Simmons a De La Salle junior made his debut for Cronulla in the 2003 NRL season.  In 2008, Simmons was part of the Cronulla side which made the preliminary final but lost to Melbourne 28–0.

Penrith Panthers
Simmons entered the Penrith Panthers camp in 2010 with high expectations to be a new attacking weapon for the team, but once again Simmons injured his left shoulder in the trial match which resulted in him being sidelined until round 14. Simmons was finally able to represent Penrith in Round 15 of the NSW Cup, playing for the Windsor Wolves.
Simmons made his Penrith first grade debut against St. George Illawarra in round 17 of the 2010 NRL season scoring a try in Penrith's victory.

In 2011, Simmons became a regular first grader for the Penrith Panthers, playing mostly left wing, though occasionally filled in the fullback position. Simmons played 23 games and was Penrith's to try scorer with Lachlan Coote, scoring 12 tries.

Simmons played 16 games for the Penrith Panthers in 2012, but only scored two tries.

Simmons finished the 2013 NRL season as the leagues equal leading try scorer for the regular season, having crossed for 19 tries for the Penrith club. He shared the award with David Williams of the Manly-Warringah Sea Eagles and James McManus of the Newcastle Knights.

Retirement
On 31 August, Simmons announced his retirement from rugby league at the end of the 2015 NRL season.
On 28 June 2015, Simmons scored four tries in Penrith's 35–12 victory over the Wests Tigers at Leichhardt Oval.

Personal life 
Simmons is a Christian, becoming one after attending a youth group. He has been ordained as an Anglican minister, after completing a Bachelor of Theology part-time at Moore Theological College, Sydney (2010-2015) and as a full-time student in 2015–2016.   Simmons commenced as the Assistant Minister at Emu Plains Anglican Church in 2018, where he is currently serving the people of Western Sydney.

References

External links
2015 Penrith Panthers profile
Cronulla Sharks profile
NRL profile
Sydney Anglicans David Simmons page
Emu Plains Anglican Church

1984 births
Living people
Australian rugby league players
Penrith Panthers players
Cronulla-Sutherland Sharks players
New South Wales City Origin rugby league team players
Windsor Wolves players
Rugby league wingers
Rugby league fullbacks
Rugby league centres
Australian Anglicans
People from the Sutherland Shire
Rugby league players from Sydney